GBA-20 (Gupis–Yasin-I) is a constituency of Gilgit Baltistan Assembly which is currently represented by Nazir Ahmad of Pakistan Tehreek-e-Insaf.

History 
The constituency was GBA-20 (Ghizer-II). In 2019, Gupis–Yasin was made a district.

Members

Election results

2009
Ali Madad Sher of PPP became member of assembly by getting 3,206 votes.

2015
Fida Khan, an Independent politician won this seat by getting 4,991 votes.

References

Gilgit-Baltistan Legislative Assembly constituencies